Tripuri refer to:

Tripuri people, an ethnic group in India and Bangladesh, also known as Tipra people
Tripuri language
Tripuri nationalism
Tripuri calendar
Tripuri culture
Tripuri cuisine
Tripuri dances
Tripuri dress
Tripuri games and sports
Tripuri Kshatriya, a Vaishnav caste group including almost all the members of the Tripuri, Reang, Jamatia and Noatia ethnic groups
Tripuri, Madhya Pradesh, ancient Kalchuri capital near Jabalpur
Twipra Kingdom, also called the Tripuri Kingdom
Tripura (princely state), a British protectorate from 1809 to 1949
Tripura, a state in northeast India

Language and nationality disambiguation pages